The FIBA Under-17 Basketball World Cup (formerly FIBA Under-17 World Championship) is the under-17 men's world basketball championship organised by the International Basketball Federation (FIBA). The event was held for the first time in July 2010, and is held biennially.

Composition
According to the updated FIBA Internal Regulations, the FIBA Under-17 World Cup shall be held every two years (2016, 2018, 2020, etc.).

Sixteen teams, representing all continents, are eligible to participate in the FIBA U17 World Cup as follows:

 Directly Qualified:
 The Host Nation (usually designated by the Central Board a year before the scheduled tournament)
From each Continent:
 Two from FIBA Africa: Finalists of the FIBA Under-16 African Championship.
 Four from FIBA Americas: Semi-finalists of the FIBA Under-16 Americas Championship.
 Four from FIBA Asia and FIBA Oceania: Semi-finalists of the FIBA Under-16 Asian Championship.
 Five from FIBA Europe: Semi-finalists and the fifth-placed team of the FIBA Under-16 European Championship.

Summaries

Medal table

Tournament awards

Most recent award winners (2022)

Participation details

Debut of national teams

See also
FIBA Under-19 Basketball World Cup
FIBA Under-17 Women's Basketball World Cup
FIBA Under-19 Women's Basketball World Cup

References

External links
FIBA official website

 
Under
Under-17 basketball competitions between national teams
World youth sports competitions
Recurring sporting events established in 2010
World championships in basketball